Lerner, David, Littenberg, Krumholz & Mentilk LLP, commonly referred to as Lerner David, is an intellectual property boutique law firm with offices in the United States and China. It specializes in intellectual property (IP) disciplines including, among them, patents, trademarks, copyrights, Internet law and trade secrets. Founded in 1969, the firm provides legal advice to clients on intellectual property litigation, patent procurement, licensing, mergers and acquisitions, due diligence and asset management issues.

History

In 1969, Larry Lerner, Sid David and Joe Littenberg founded the original law firm in Newark, New Jersey. The firm moved from Newark to Westfield, New Jersey in 1973. In October 2019, the firm moved its main office to Cranford, New Jersey. Originally named Lerner, David & Littenberg, the firm later became Lerner, David, Littenberg, Krumholz & Mentilk.

In 2010, Lerner David opened offices in Guangzhou, China.  The firm was the first American intellectual property law firm located in the Pearl River Delta. Licensed by the Chinese Ministry of Justice, the firm's Guangzhou office counsels Asian companies and law firms on intellectual property matters in the United States, and American companies on intellectual property matters in China.

Awards

The firm is listed by “Super Lawyers” magazine and “Chambers and Partners” as a top IP law firm in New Jersey. In 2011, the firm's partner William L. Mentlik was named as “Newark Best Lawyers Litigation – Patent Lawyer of the Year” and Charles P. Kennedy, a partner at the firm was named “Newark Best Lawyers Litigation – Intellectual Property Lawyer of the Year.”

Notable Cases

Lerner David represented Gordon Gould in establishing the validity of his patented inventions. Gould is best known for his thirty-year fight with the United States Patent and Trademark Office to obtain patents for his laser and related technologies. In subsequent court cases, the firm won victories for Gould in enforcing his patent rights against laser manufactures.

Practice Areas

 Litigation
 Licensing
 Merger and Acquisition Due Diligence
 Clearance Opinions and Patent Studies
 ANDA, Biosimilar and New Drug Advice
 Patent Procurement in the U.S.
 International Patent Procurement
 Patent Reexamination, Reissue and Opposition
 Risk Management
 IP Asset and Portfolio Management
 Copyrights
 Trademark and Trade Dress Procurement in the U.S.
 International Trademark Procurement
 Trade Secrets
 Internet Law
 ITC Litigation

References

Intellectual property law firms
Law firms established in 1969
1969 establishments in New Jersey